Humphrey Polepole is a Tanzanian politician serving as the Chama Cha Mapinduzi's Ideology and Publicity Secretary and Member of Parliament appointed by President John Magufuli. Before being appointed Humphrey Polepole was a District Commissioner for Ubungo district for five months and earlier Polepole also served as District Commissioner for Musoma District for two months.

External links

References

Living people
Tanzanian civil servants
Chama Cha Mapinduzi politicians
Chama Cha Mapinduzi MPs
Tanzanian MPs 2020–2025
Nominated Tanzanian MPs
Year of birth missing (living people)
People from Kagera Region
Kivukoni College alumni